is a puzzle video game for the Nintendo 64. It was released only in English in Japan in 1998, and is the only Nintendo 64 game that works with the bio sensor accessory, which it included.

Bio sensor

The bio sensor is a Nintendo 64 accessory produced by SETA and only available in Japan. It was sold on its own or packaged with Tetris 64. It looks like a Nintendo 64 controller pak with a wire coming out of it with a clip on the end. One end of the sensor plugs into the extension port on the Nintendo 64 controller, and the other end clips onto the player's ear. The device measures the user's heart rate and adjusts the game's difficulty accordingly.

Reception

The game was praised for its multiplayer mode, and was at the time the only Nintendo 64 Tetris game which allowed four-player mode.

The game was criticized for its poor graphics and simple backgrounds which could not match other Tetris games out on the system at the same time, such as Magical Tetris Challenge or The New Tetris. Famitsu gave it a score of 27 out of 40.

Notes

References

Nintendo 64 games
Nintendo 64-only games
1998 video games
Tetris
Japan-exclusive video games
SETA Corporation games
Video games developed in Japan
Multiplayer and single-player video games